The Party of Slovenian People (Stranka slovenskega naroda, SSN) is an extra-parliamentary party in Slovenia. In the 2008 legislative election in Slovenia, the party won 0.25% of the popular vote and no seats in the National Assembly. In the early election on 4 December 2011, the party won 0.09% of the vote, thus not gaining any seats in the National Assembly. The party won 0.4% of the vote in the European Parliament election on 25 May 2014, failing to gain any seats.

The party has its roots in the far-right Slovenian National Right party, which was transformed and renamed after its failure in the 1996 parliamentary election. In later years, it was associated with the nationalistic organization Hervardi. The party's candidate for the 2008 legislative election was Andrej Šiško, formerly a prominent member of the ultras group "Viole Maribor". Šiško was apprehended during a pre-election debate appearance due to an outstanding arrest warrant after failing to appear in prison to begin serving a prison sentence for a 1992 murder attempt.

References

External links
Official web site

2001 establishments in Slovenia
Conservative parties in Slovenia
Direct democracy parties
Eurosceptic parties in Slovenia
Nationalist parties in Slovenia
Political parties established in 2001